Too Gangsta for Radio is a compilation album by Death Row Records, released on September 26, 2000. Production was handled by Cold 187um, Break Bread Productions, Kenny McCloud, Myrion, Quincy Jones III, VMF, Ant Banks, Big Hollis, Blaqthoven, Daz Dillinger, Gary "Sugarfoot" Greenberg, Kurt "Kobane" Couthon, LJ and P. Killer Trackz, with Suge Knight serving as executive producer. It features contributions from the late 2Pac, Crooked I, Dresta, Swoop G, Tha Realest, Above The Law, CJ Mac, G.P., Juice, K-9, Keitarock, Lil' C-Style, Mac Shawn, Nuttz, The Relativez, Twist and Young Hoggs, as well as Ja Rule, Scarface, The Lox and Treach. Most of the songs are diss songs projected at former Death Row artists, including Dr. Dre, Snoop Dogg, Nate Dogg and Daz Dillinger among others. Although the album sold poorly, it peaked at #171 on the Billboard 200, #44 on the Top R&B/Hip-Hop Albums and #15 on the Independent Albums charts in the United States.

Track listing

Sample credits
Track 2 contains an interpolation of "Friends" written by Jalil Hutchins and Lawrence Smith
Track 10 contains an interpolation of "Human Nature" written by John Bettis and Steven Porcaro

Personnel
Brian Gardner – mastering
Larry Hawley – photography

Charts

References

External links

2000 compilation albums
Albums produced by Ant Banks
Albums produced by Big Hollis
Albums produced by Cold 187um
Gangsta rap compilation albums
Albums produced by Daz Dillinger
Albums produced by Quincy Jones III
Death Row Records compilation albums
West Coast hip hop compilation albums